General Beckwith may refer to:

George Beckwith (British Army officer) (1753–1823), British Army general
John Charles Beckwith (British Army officer) (1789–1862), British Army major general
Thomas Sydney Beckwith (1770–1831), British Army lieutenant general
William Beckwith (1795–1871), British Army general

See also
Merton Beckwith-Smith (1890–1942), British Army major general